Chom Singnoi (born 2 September 1979) is a Thai weightlifter. He competed in the men's featherweight event at the 2000 Summer Olympics.

References

1979 births
Living people
Chom Singnoi
Chom Singnoi
Weightlifters at the 2000 Summer Olympics
Place of birth missing (living people)
Weightlifters at the 1998 Asian Games
Weightlifters at the 2002 Asian Games
Chom Singnoi
Chom Singnoi
Chom Singnoi